Flathead County is in the U.S. state of Montana. At the 2020 census, its population was 104,357, making it the state's fourth most populous county. Its county seat is Kalispell. Its numerical designation (used in the issuance of license plates) is 7. Its northern border is on the state's north border, making it contiguous with the Canada–US border, facing British Columbia.

Flathead County comprises the Kalispell, Montana Micropolitan Statistical Area, with neighboring Lake County following soon after.

History
Flathead County was founded in 1893. Some sources cite the supposed practice of the Salish tribe flattening infants' heads as the origin of the name Flathead, but there is no record of Salish Indians ever having that appearance.

Geography
The county includes much of Flathead Lake, the Flathead Valley, and the Flathead River. These natural treasures were created by glacial activity which ended approximately 10,000 years ago. The Flathead Valley is the southern extension of a prominent valley called the Rockey Mountain Trench, which runs from the Yukon Territory in Canada as far south as Flathead Lake.  The Trench in northwestern Montana was created by subsidence along a major extensional fault, which continues today.  After the valley formed, glaciers flowing down the Trench from British Columbia, and into it from the surrounding mountain ranges left a flat valley floor and dammed the Flathead River drainage to create Flathead Lake.  Several tribes have long used the Flathead Lake, and the Bitterroot Salish, Kootenai, and Pend d'Oreilles tribes are represented on the Flathead Reservation. The western part of Glacier National Park is located in the county.

It is the third-largest county in Montana by land area and second-largest by total area.

Ecology
Wildlife includes bobcats, black bears, coyotes, deer, elk, grizzly bears, lynx, mountain lions, and wolves.

National protected areas

 Pacific Northwest National Scenic Trail (part)
 Flathead National Forest (part)
 Glacier National Park (part)
 Kootenai National Forest (part)
 Lolo National Forest (part)
 Lost Trail National Wildlife Refuge

Demographics

2000 census
As of the 2000 United States census, there were 74,471 people, 29,588 households, and 20,415 families living in the county. The population density was 15 people per square mile (6/km2). There were 34,773 housing units at an average density of 7 per square mile (3/km2). The racial makeup of the county was 96.26% White, 0.15% Black or African American, 1.15% Native American, 0.46% Asian, 0.06% Pacific Islander, 0.41% from other races, and 1.50% from two or more races. 1.42% of the population were Hispanic or Latino of any race. 21.7% were of German, 11.3% Irish, 11.0% Norwegian, 10.3% English and 9.1% United States or American ancestry.

There were 29,588 households, out of which 32.50% had children under the age of 18 living with them, 56.90% were married couples living together, 8.30% had a female householder with no husband present, and 31.00% were non-families. 25.20% of all households were made up of individuals, and 8.90% had someone living alone who was 65 years of age or older. The average household size was 2.48, and the average family size was 2.97.

The county population contained 25.90% under 18, 7.40% from 18 to 24, 27.40% from 25 to 44, 26.40% from 45 to 64, and 13.00% who were 65 years of age or older. The median age was 39 years. For every 100 females, there were 98.30 males. For every 100 females age 18 and over, there were 96.10 males.

The median income for a household in the county was $34,466, and the median income for a family was $40,702. Males had a median income of $31,908 versus $20,619 for females. The per capita income for the county was $18,112.  About 9.40% of families and 13.00% of the population were below the poverty line, including 16.70% of those under age 18 and 8.60% of those age 65 or over.

2010 census

As of the 2010 United States census, there were 90,928 people, 37,504 households, and 24,817 families living in the county. The racial makeup of the county was 95.5% white, 1.1% American Indian, 0.6% Asian, 0.2% black or African American, 0.1% Pacific islander, 0.4% from other races, and 2.1% from two or more races. Those of Hispanic or Latino origin made up 2.3% of the population. In terms of ancestry, 28.1% were German, 15.0% were English, 14.8% were Irish, 9.3% were Norwegian, and 4.6% were American.

Of the 37,504 households, 29.5% had children under the age of 18 living with them, 52.8% were married couples living together, 8.7% had a female householder with no husband present, 33.8% were non-families, and 27.2% of all households were made up of individuals. The average household size was 2.40, and the average family size was 2.91. The median age was 41.2 years.

The median income for a household in the county was $44,998, and the median income for a family was $53,940. Males had a median income of $39,767 versus $28,026 for females. The per capita income for the county was $24,721. About 8.4% of families and 11.7% of the population were below the poverty line, including 17.8% of those under age 18 and 7.7% of those age 65 or over.

Politics
Along with Yellowstone County (home to Billings), Flathead County is one of Montana's more populous counties that leans heavily Republican. It has last voted Democratic in 1964, and has voted over 60% Republican in every presidential election since 1996 save 2008.

Infrastructure
Kalispell Regional Medical Center is the county's largest hospital.
North Valley Hospital is located in Whitefish
Flathead County Library System has 4 locations: 

Whitefish Library is separate
Flathead County Solid Waste (Landfill) is located between Kalispell and Whitefish
There are 16 Fire Districts and 3 Fire Service Areas
There are 6 High Schools including private
There are 21 Public School Districts
Legislature
3 County Commissioner Districts
11 House Districts
7 Senate Districts

Communities

Cities
 Columbia Falls
 Kalispell (county seat)
 Whitefish

Census-designated places

 Batavia
 Bigfork
 Coram
 Essex
 Evergreen
 Forest Hill Village
 Helena Flats
 Hungry Horse
 Kila
 Lakeside
 Little Bitterroot Lake
 Marion
 Martin City
 Niarada
 Olney
 Pinnacle
 Polebridge
 Rhodes
 Snowslip
 Somers
 West Glacier

Other unincorporated communities
 Apgar Village
 Lake McDonald

Adjacent counties

 Regional District of East Kootenay, British Columbia – north
 Waterton Lakes National Park (Improvement District No. 4), Alberta – northeast
 Glacier County – east
 Pondera County – east
 Teton County – east
 Lewis and Clark County – southeast
 Powell County – southeast
 Missoula County – southeast
 Lake County – south
 Sanders County – southwest
 Lincoln County – west

Notable people
 Joe Bereta, member of the sketch comedy duo Barats and Bereta based in Spokane, Washington. Currently co-hosts SourceFed on YouTube.
 Phil Jackson, NBA coach and player
 Dorothy M. Johnson, writer of Westerns
 Braxton Mitchell, Montana state representative
 Maury Povich, talk show host known for his TV show Maury
 Keith Regier, Montana state senator
 Alice Ritzman, LPGA golf professional
 Michelle Williams, actress who achieved recognition for her leading role in the TV teen drama series Dawson's Creek
Derek Skees, Montana state representative

In popular culture
Miami Herald columnist Dave Barry frequently cites the police blotter of the Flathead Beacon in Flathead County as a source of humorous material. It is written in a spare, surrealist style by local man Micah Drew, following the pattern set by earlier writers Christie Burns and Justin Franz.

See also
 List of lakes in Flathead County, Montana (A-L)
 List of lakes in Flathead County, Montana (M-Z)
 List of mountains in Flathead County, Montana (A-L)
 List of mountains in Flathead County, Montana (M-Z)
 National Register of Historic Places listings in Flathead County, Montana

References

External links
 The Daily Inter Lake
 Flathead Beacon Newsletter Website
 References to Flathead County on Dave Barry's blog

 
1893 establishments in Montana
Populated places established in 1893